Şuacan Pişkin (born August 4, 1990) is a Turkish professional basketball player who plays for Galatasaray Liv Hospital.

Professional career

Early years
Pişkin was born in İstanbul and started playing basketball for İTÜ in 2003. In 2006, he was started to play for first team when he was 16 years old. He played for 3 seasons, until he was loaned to Yeşilyurt for 2009-10 season. He returned to İTÜ for next season and transferred to Mersin BŞB in 2011. He returned to İstanbul, İstanbulspor. His wages did not paid for 8 months and he left the team. In 2013 he joined third division, TB3L team Basketspor.

Galatasaray
In the summer of 2013, he joined to Galatasaray Liv Hospital as a training player. However he stayed at the team for the 2013-14 season and become part of TBL finalist team. In the summer of 2014, it was announced that he will be with team for next season. However, he then signed with Adanaspor. In February 2015, Pişkin joined Galatasaray to replace the injured point guard Carlos Arroyo.

References

External links
 TBLStat.net Profile
 Eurobasket Profile

1990 births
Living people
Point guards
Shooting guards
Basketball players from Istanbul
Turkish men's basketball players
Adanaspor Basketbol players
Galatasaray S.K. (men's basketball) players